Wyoming Highway 530 (WYO 530) is a  state road that lies in southwestern Sweetwater County, Wyoming that runs along the west side of the Green River/Flaming Gorge Reservoir

Route description
Wyoming Highway 530 begins its south end at the Wyoming-Utah State Line at Utah State Route 43; this near Washam, Wyoming. From the state line, WYO 530 heads north, paralleling the west side of the Flaming Gorge Reservoir and Green River. For this length, the highway is known as West Flaming Gorge Road. The Wyoming Department of Transportation (WYDOT) has invested a significant amount of time and money into improving the highway from Green River south to the border near Manila, Utah. The improved sections of Highway 530 have widened shoulders and more passing lanes, but is usually two lanes. WYO 530 intersects no major highways along its  route, however, it is a very scenic road, paralleling Flaming Gorge Reservoir. The reservoir is famous for its fishing, especially bass fishing, and has one of the largest shorelines in the state. It is the result of the Green River being dammed up near Dutch John, Utah. When Highway 530 enters Green River, it becomes a five-lane highway named Uinta Avenue (two lanes each way plus a middle turn lane). In 1996, the Wyoming 530 bridge over the Union Pacific Railroad yards was widened from two lanes to four lanes. On the north side of the bridge, WYO 530 comes to an end at I-80 Business/US 30 Business (Flaming Gorge Way).

Major intersections

See also 
U.S. Route 191 (East Flaming Gorge Road), that parallels the east side of the Flaming Gorge Reservoir.

References 

 Official 2003 State Highway Map of Wyoming

External links 

 Wyoming State Routes
 City of Green River website 

Transportation in Sweetwater County, Wyoming
530